Alaimo is a surname. Notable people with the surname include:

 Anthony Alaimo (1920–2009), United States district court judge
 Edoardo Alaimo (1893–1962), Italian fencer
 Jay Alaimo (born 1972), American movie director, writer and producer
 Lorenzo Alaimo (born 1952), Italian racing cyclist
 Marc Alaimo (born 1942), American actor
Nicola Alaimo, Italian baritone, nephew of Simone
 Simone Alaimo (born 1950), Italian bass-baritone, uncle of Nicola
 Steve Alaimo (fl. 1960s), American singer, record producer, and label owner
…William J Alaimo aka Billy (Born in Brooklyn 1966) Actor , singer , Chef and Indy Pro Wrestler Trained by Hall of Fame Johnny Rodz.